Development Driller III is a fifth generation, Vanuatu-flagged dynamic positioning semi-submersible ultra-deepwater drilling rig owned by Transocean and operated under lease agreements by various petroleum exploration and production companies worldwide.

On 2 May 2010, Development Driller III started drilling a relief well on Macondo Prospect to stop massive oil spill caused by the explosion and subsequent loss of the Deepwater Horizon.

References

External links
Transocean official website
 Development Driller III current position at VesselTracker

2009 ships
Drilling rigs
Semi-submersibles
Ships built in Singapore
Transocean